Tenacibaculum adriaticum is a bacterium. It is rod-shaped, translucent yellow-pigmented, Gram-negative and its type strain is B390T (=DSM 18961T =JCM 14633T). This species is able to hydrolyse aesculin.

References

Further reading

Lawrence, John M., ed. Sea Urchins: Biology and Ecology. Vol. 38. Academic Press, 2013.
Pavlidis, Michalis, and Constantinos Mylonas, eds. Sparidae: Biology and aquaculture of gilthead sea bream and other species. Wiley. com, 2011.

External links 
LPSN
Type strain of Tenacibaculum adriaticum at BacDive -  the Bacterial Diversity Metadatabase

Flavobacteria
Bacteria described in 2008